Lansing High School is a public high school in Lansing, Kansas, United States, operated by Lansing USD 469 school district. It offers many extracurricular activities and athletic programs.

History
Established in 1920, the school has a long and storied history. The current building opened in 2015.

Extracurricular activities

Athletics
Lansing offers a variety of athletic programs and are referred to as the "Lions". The school is a member of the Kansas State High School Activities Association and athletic programs compete at the 5A level in the United Kansas Conference. In 2014 the Lansing boys' basketball team won the state championship.

Sports offered at Lansing High School include:

Fall sports
 Cross country
 Football
 Soccer (boys')
 Tennis (girls')
 Volleyball

Winter sports
 Basketball
 Bowling
 Swimming (boys')
 Wrestling

Spring sports
 Baseball
 Golf
 Soccer (girls')
 Softball
 Swimming (girls')
 Tennis (boys')
 Track and field

Notable alumni
Doug Lamborn (1972), current Republican Representative of Colorado's 5th congressional district, serving since 2007

See also
 List of high schools in Kansas
 List of unified school districts in Kansas

References

External links
 School website
 District website

Public high schools in Kansas
Schools in Leavenworth County, Kansas
1920 establishments in Kansas